Ernie is a masculine given name. It may also refer to:

 ERNIE (Electronic Random Number Indicator Equipment), the Premium Bond computer
 Ernie (comic strip), a cartoon published in the British comic Eagle
 "Ernie (The Fastest Milkman in the West)", a song by Benny Hill
 Ernie Awards, an Australian mock award for sexist behaviour
 Piranha Club, formerly Ernie, a comic strip by Bud Grace
 Ernie, a pseudonym used by the musician Michael Kiske for the Avantasia project The Metal Opera

See also
 Erne (disambiguation)